Upside Down: The Creation Records Story is a 2010 film by Document Productions which charts the story of Creation Records. Directed by Danny O'Connor, the film features Alan McGee, Noel Gallagher, Bobby Gillespie, Mark Gardener and more.

Info
Over a quarter of a century since it began and a decade after it folded, this is the definitive story of Creation Records, which operated under the stewardship of Alan McGee between 1984 and 1999.

The film has toured extensively to critical acclaim at a host of film and music Festivals worldwide including SXSW in Austin, Texas. Glastonbury, Berlin and Tokyo.

The film won the annual Mojo Vision Award at the Glenfiddich Mojo Honours in July 2011.

Notes

External links 
 Upside Down Website
 Facebook Page
 Document Productions Website
 IMdb

2010 films
2010 documentary films
Documentary films about the music industry
Rockumentaries
British documentary films
Indie rock
2010s English-language films
2010s British films